James Donald Brennan (December 2, 1903 – April 26, 1953) was a Major League Baseball pitcher who played from 1933 to 1937 with several teams. He batted and threw right-handed. Brennan had a 21–12 record with a 4.19 earned run average over 397 innings pitched in 141 career games. In his final year, he pitched for the National League champion New York Giants against their crosstown rival New York Yankees, tossing 3 scoreless innings across 2 games in the 1937 World Series.

Brennan was an alumnus of Georgetown University.

References

External links

1903 births
1953 deaths
Major League Baseball pitchers
Baseball players from Maine
New York Yankees players
Cincinnati Reds players
New York Giants (NL) players
Sportspeople from Augusta, Maine